The brownish-headed antbird (Myrmelastes brunneiceps) is a species of passerine bird in the family Thamnophilidae. It is found in humid forest in the far south-western Amazon in Peru and Bolivia.

Until recently, the brownish-headed antbird was considered a subspecies of the spot-winged antbird. A 2007 study of the vocal characteristics found significant differences between the taxa and based on this evidence the brownish-headed antbird was promoted to species status. As presently defined, the brownish-headed antbird is monotypic.

The conservation status of the brownish-headed antbird has been assessed by BirdLife International, to be of Least Concern.

References

brownish-headed antbird
Birds of the Peruvian Andes
brownish-headed antbird
brownish-headed antbird